Poreỹ rape is a 2016 novel by Paraguayan writer Hugo Centurión. Written in Guarani, it is part of a national revival of the language.

References 

Paraguayan novels
2016 novels
Guarani-language literature